James St Vincent Saumarez, 4th Baron de Saumarez (17 July 1843 – 25 April 1937), was a British diplomat and peer, for some forty-five years a member of the House of Lords. The name is pronounced "Sommerez".

Early life
Born in London, while his parents were living at 41, Prince's Gate, South Kensington, Saumarez was a grandson of Admiral Lord de Saumarez (1757–1836), for whom the peerage was created, and was the eldest son of Colonel John Saumarez, 3rd Baron de Saumarez, an army officer, by his marriage to Caroline Esther Rhodes, a daughter of William Rhodes. He was educated at Eton, Cheltenham College, and Trinity College, Cambridge, where he matriculated in the Lent term of 1861 and graduated BA in 1863, promoted to MA in 1867.

Life and career

After rising to the rank of captain in the Grenadier Guards, Saumarez joined the Diplomatic Service in 1867. His overseas postings were to Paris (1868), Berlin (1872), Athens (1873), Japan (1875), Paris and Rome (1880), and Brussels (1881). In 1869, he exercised his droit de retraite to buy  Saumarez Park and the Le Guet estate at Castel on the island of Guernsey, after his father, the third Baron, had put the property up for sale. On 10 October 1882, while serving as Second Secretary in the British embassy to the King of the Belgians, Saumarez married Jane Anne Broke, eldest daughter of Captain Charles Acton Vere-Broke, and the granddaughter of another Royal Navy officer, Admiral Sir Philip Broke, "Broke of the ". He retired from the Diplomatic Corps in 1885, and in 1891 succeeded his father as Baron de Saumarez and as a baronet. In 1887, on the death of her uncle Admiral Sir George Broke-Middleton, his wife inherited the Shrubland Park, Broke Hall, and Livermore Park estates in Suffolk.

With his wife, Saumarez had three daughters, Evelyn (1883–1934), Marion (born 1885), and Gladys (1887–1975), and lastly one son, James St Vincent Broke Saumarez (1889–1969).

He spent many years in developing Saumarez Park, including building a Japanese house and temple there. He acquired the temple in Japan, had it dismantled and shipped to Europe, then re-erected it on his Guernsey estate. In 1912 his portrait was painted by Thérèse Geraldy. He died at Saumarez Park in 1937, and was succeeded by his son, James.

Descendants
Saumarez had several grandchildren by his son and his daughter Evelyn. His granddaughter Christine Saumarez married the equestrian Harry Llewellyn and was the mother of Dai and Roddy Llewellyn. He is also the great-grandfather of the present peer, Eric Saumarez, 7th Baron de Saumarez.

References

External links
Portrait at BBC.co.uk

1843 births
1937 deaths
Alumni of Trinity College, Cambridge
Barons in the Peerage of the United Kingdom
Eldest sons of British hereditary barons
British diplomats in East Asia
Grenadier Guards officers
Guernsey people
Members of HM Diplomatic Service
People educated at Cheltenham College
People educated at Eton College
James
19th-century British diplomats